Brothers Five (Chinese: 五虎屠龍) is a 1970 Hong Kong wuxia film directed by Lo Wei and produced by the Shaw Brothers Studio.

Plot 
Five brothers were separated at birth when the evil lord of Flying Dragon Villa murdered their father. The children’s caretaker sliced the backs of their left hands so that they would be able to one day reunite and take their revenge on the evil lord (Tien Feng). Yen Lai (Cheng Pei-pei) is a woman who must reunite the Kao brothers to rid the Teng Lung Manor of killers whilst avenging the murder of their father.

Cast
Cheng Pei-pei as Miss Yen Hsing-kung
Lo Lieh as Kao Hsia
Chang Yi as Scholar Kao Chih
Yueh Hua as Valet Kao Wei
Chin Han as Blacksmith Kao Hao
Kao Yuen as Security chief Kao Yung
Tien Feng as Master Lung Cheng-feng
Unicorn Chan as Flying Fork Wang
 as Wang Liao'er
Sammo Hung as Chu, escort service man
Ku Feng as Lord Wan Bo-fu
James Tien as Master Ting Zhi-shan
Nam Wai-lit as Li Xiaosan
Chin Chun as Wang's thug
Lee Wan-chung as Butler Teng
Lee Ka-ting as Master Yau
Chow Siu-loi as Wang Fat
Lee Sau-kei as Lung's servant
 as waiter
Chu Gam as waiter
Hao Li-jen as villager
To Man-bo
Someno Yukio as escort service man
Ling Hon as servant
Luk Chuen as Wan's man
Wu Chi-chin as Lung's gate guard
Yeung Chak-lam as Lung's gate guard
Kwan Yan as restaurant customer
Wong Chi-ming as one of the Weird Eight
Kei Ho-chiu as Lung's thug
Hoh Wan as Lung's bodyguard
Wong Kung-miu as villager
Goo Chim-hung as villager
Lam Yuen
Gam Tin-chue
Lam Ching-ying
Sham Chin-bo
Fuk Yan-cheng

References

External links 
 Brothers Five at HKcinemamagic.com
 
 

1970 films
Hong Kong action films
Hong Kong martial arts films
Wuxia films
Shaw Brothers Studio films
Films directed by Lo Wei
1970 action films
1970 martial arts films
Films set in the Ming dynasty
1970s Hong Kong films